Nicholas Daniel Murphy (1811– 6 January 1889) was an Irish politician from Cork. He was a Member of Parliament (MP) from 1865 to 1880.

Standing as a Liberal, he was elected to the Parliament of the United Kingdom at a by-election on 14 February 1865 for Cork City, after the resignation from the House of Commons of the Liberal MP Francis Lyons. He was re-elected unopposed at the general election in July 1865, and held the seat against Irish Conservative Party candidates at the 1868 general election. In 1874, having joined the new Home Rule League (founded in 1873), he was returned to the House of Commons for a fourth time, defeating both Conservative candidates and an independent nationalist.

However, at the 1880 general election, he stood once again as a Liberal, but lost his seat.

References

External links 
 

1811 births
1890 deaths
Members of the Parliament of the United Kingdom for Cork City
UK MPs 1859–1865
UK MPs 1865–1868
UK MPs 1868–1874
UK MPs 1874–1880
Irish Liberal Party MPs
Home Rule League MPs